Sung Yun-mo (born 27 June 1963) is a South Korean politician previously served as the Minister of Trade, Industry and Energy under President Moon Jae-in from 2018 to 2021.      

Before promoted to Minister, he was President Moon's first Commissioner of Korean Intellectual Property Office - a vice-ministerial post. He was previously spokesperson of the Ministry and Deputy Minister of Economic Policy Coordination at Office for Government Policy Coordination under preceding president Park Geun-hye. 

After passing the state exam in 1988, he has built his career solely in public service. He worked at numerous industry-related departments including now-Ministry of Economy and Finance, now-Ministry of SMEs and Startups, and Ministry of Trade, Industry and Energy.

Sung holds three degrees - a bachelor in economics and master's in policy studies from Seoul National University and a doctorate in economics from University of Missouri.

References 

1963 births
Living people
Seoul National University alumni
University of Missouri alumni
People from Daejeon
Government ministers of South Korea
Trade ministers
Energy ministers
Industry ministers